Edward Martin (September 18, 1879 – March 19, 1967) was an American lawyer and Republican party politician from Waynesburg, Pennsylvania. He served as the 32nd governor of Pennsylvania from 1943 until 1947 and as a United States Senator from Pennsylvania from 1947 until 1959.

Biography

Early life and military service

Martin was born in Ten Mile, Pennsylvania on September 18, 1879, attending public schools in his youth. He served with Pennsylvania volunteers during the Spanish–American War from May 11, 1898 to August 22, 1899, and reached the rank of sergeant. He studied law and graduated from Waynesburg College in Waynesburg, Pennsylvania, in 1901.

Martin enlisted in the Pennsylvania National Guard after the Spanish-American War at his former rank of sergeant, and later became an officer. He was promoted to first lieutenant on January 15, 1900, to captain on July 11, 1905, and to major on July 6, 1910. The Pennsylvania National Guard was mobilized for the Mexican Border Expedition in 1916, and Martin was on active duty from June 22 to October 27, 1916. When the United States entered World War I, Martin went on active duty again on July 15, 1917. During the war, Martin commanded the 109th Infantry Regiment from September 6–9, 1918 (being promoted to the temporary rank of lieutenant colonel on September 9) and the 110th Infantry Regiment from September 7 to October 14, 1918. For valor and wounds received in combat, Martin earned a Distinguished Service Cross and a Purple Heart, both with oak leaf clusters. He left active duty after the Armistice, on April 25, 1919.

On July 29, 1920, Martin was promoted to colonel in the Pennsylvania National Guard, and became the first post-war commander of the 110th Infantry Regiment, 28th Division, a position he held from that date until August 17, 1922. On December 15, 1922, Martin was promoted to brigadier general and assumed command of the 55th Infantry Brigade, 28th Division. On June 26, 1939, he became a major general and commander of the 28th Division. After the United States entered World War II, Major General Martin was retired on April 1, 1942, because of Army regulations concerning over-age officers.

He was also president of the National Guard Association of the United States in 1940.

Career in law and politics

Martin was admitted to the bar in 1905 and commenced practice in Waynesburg. He was a burgess of East Waynesburg from 1902 to 1905, solicitor of Greene County from 1908 to 1910 and again from 1916 to 1920. He served as auditor general of Pennsylvania from 1925 to 1929 and State treasurer from 1929 to 1933. He chaired the Republican State Committee of Pennsylvania from 1928 to 1934. He was adjutant general of Pennsylvania from 1939 to 1943. He had varied business interests, including fire insurance, oil and gas, and banking.

Martin was elected Governor of Pennsylvania in November 1942. He served as president of the Council of State Governments in 1946 and was elected as a Republican to the United States Senate in the same year.  In 1947, Martin received the American Legion's Distinguished Service Medal.  Martin was re-elected to the Senate in 1952. During the Eighty-third Congress from 1953 to 1955, when the Republicans were in the majority, he was chairman of the Committee on Public Works. Martin voted in favor of the Civil Rights Act of 1957. Martin did not seek re-nomination to a third term in 1958. He died in Washington, Pennsylvania, in 1967 and is buried at Greene Mount Cemetery in Waynesburg.

Fort Indiantown Gap

Martin was prominent in the development of Fort Indiantown Gap and after his death, the United States Senate renamed the facility the Edward Martin Military Reservation, an honor that Martin himself had rejected throughout his life. The new name was never fully accepted by the military personnel who served there. In 1975, the Secretary of the Army renamed the post Fort Indiantown Gap in order to more closely align it with the other active duty stations throughout the United States.  The Joint Force Headquarters of the Pennsylvania National Guard is located at Fort Indiantown Gap, and is named Edward Martin Hall in Martin's honor.

Edward Martin Memorial Library at NGAUS
The Library at the National Guard Association of the United States (NGAUS) is dedicated to Martin and is named the Edward Martin Memorial Library. While not a circulating library, it serves as one of the foremost collections of National Guard documents and is ideal for researchers. Original volumes include a complete collection of NGAUS Conference minutes dating to 1879 and Adjutant General (TAG) Reports dating to the early 20th Century. The Library may be found in the National Guard Memorial Building, One Massachusetts Ave., NW, Washington DC 20001. The Edward Martin Memorial Library is managed and maintained by the National Guard Educational Foundation (NGEF).

See also
 List of members of the American Legion

References

External links
Generals of World War II

|-

|-

|-

|-

|-

|-

|-

|-

|-

1879 births
1967 deaths
National Guard (United States) generals
Military personnel from Pennsylvania
20th-century American politicians
Chairs of the Republican State Committee of Pennsylvania
Republican Party governors of Pennsylvania
Pennsylvania Auditors General
Pennsylvania National Guard personnel
People from Greene County, Pennsylvania
Republican Party United States senators from Pennsylvania
Candidates in the 1948 United States presidential election
Waynesburg University alumni
United States Army generals of World War II
United States Army generals
United States Army personnel of World War I